Óscar Gómez Sánchez  (*Lima, 1934 - †Lima, 4 March 2008) was a Peruvian football player.

Club career
Gómez Sánchez was a forward and played for Alianza Lima, where he won the Primera División Peruana three times. He also played for River Plate and Gimnasia y Esgrima La Plata in the Primera División Argentina.

International career
Gómez Sánchez made 26 appearances and scored 14 goals for the senior Peru national football team from 1953 to 1959. He played at the South American Championship 1959 and a qualifying match for the 1958 FIFA World Cup.

Personal
Gómez Sánchez died 4 March 2008 of cancer in Lima.

References

1934 births
2008 deaths
People from Lima
Peruvian footballers
Peru international footballers
Peruvian expatriate footballers
Club Alianza Lima footballers
Club Atlético River Plate footballers
Club de Gimnasia y Esgrima La Plata footballers
Argentine Primera División players
Expatriate footballers in Argentina
Association football forwards
Deaths from cancer in Peru